Capitol Heights Historic District is a historic post-World War II neighborhood and national historic district located just north of the city of Raleigh, North Carolina. Built between about 1946 and 1949, the district currently encompasses 87 contributing buildings.

The subdivision was platted in 1946 and developed as a result of the postwar housing demand. Its homes are homogenous in form and design: small one-story two- and three-bedroom houses constructed in the Minimal Traditional style. Ernest I. Clancy and George Henry Wright were the primary builders of the Capitol Heights neighborhood. Today the neighborhood represents one of the best-preserved post-war speculative subdivisions in Raleigh.

Due to its high level of integrity, Capitol Heights was placed on the National Register of Historic Places in January 2011.

See also
 National Register of Historic Places listings in Wake County, North Carolina

References

External links 
 National Register Historic Districts in Raleigh, North Carolina, RHDC
 Capitol Heights Historic District, RHDC

Houses on the National Register of Historic Places in North Carolina
Historic districts on the National Register of Historic Places in North Carolina
National Register of Historic Places in Raleigh, North Carolina
Neighborhoods in Raleigh, North Carolina